What's the Matter with Kansas? How Conservatives Won the Heart of America (2004) is a book by American journalist and historian Thomas Frank, which explores the rise of populist anti-elitist conservatism in the United States, centering on the experience of Kansas, Frank's native state. In the late 19th century, says Frank, Kansas was known as a hotbed of the left-wing populist movement, but in recent decades, it has become overwhelmingly conservative. The book was published in Britain and Australia as What's the Matter with America?

What's the Matter with Kansas? spent 18 weeks on the New York Times Bestseller List.

Overview
According to the book, the political discourse of recent decades has dramatically shifted from social and economic equality to the use of "explosive" cultural issues, such as abortion and gay marriage, which are used to redirect anger toward "liberal elites."

Against this backdrop, Frank describes the rise of political conservatism in the social and political landscape of Kansas, which he says espouses economic policies that do not benefit the majority of people in the state.

Frank also claims a bitter divide between 'moderate' and 'conservative' Kansas Republicans (whom he labels "Mods" and "Cons") as an archetype for the future of politics in America, in which fiscal conservatism becomes the universal norm and political war is waged over a handful of hot-button cultural issues.

Instead of fighting for working class interests, the Democratic party, under the direction of the Democratic Leadership Council (DLC), effectively abandoned them by adopting economically conservative policies. To differentiate themselves from Republicans at the national level, Democrats also focused on socio-cultural wedge issues:

The book also details how Kathleen Sebelius, a Democrat, was elected governor in conservative Kansas. By emphasizing issues such as health care and school funding and avoiding hot-button social issues, Sebelius successfully fractured the Kansas GOP and won a clear majority.

Frank says that the conservative coalition is the dominant coalition in American politics. There are two sides to this coalition, according to the author: Economic conservatives want business tax cuts and deregulation, while social conservatives focus on culture. Frank says that since the coalition formed in the late 1960s, the coalition has been "fantastically rewarding" for the economic conservatives. The policies of the Republicans in power have been exclusively economic, but the coalition has caused the social conservatives to be worse off economically, due to these pro-corporate policies. Meanwhile, the social issues that the "Cons" faction pushes never go anywhere after the election. According to Frank, "abortion is never outlawed, school prayer never returns, the culture industry is never forced to clean up its act." He attributes this partly to conservatives "waging cultural battles where victory is impossible," such as a constitutional amendment banning gay marriage. He also argues that the very capitalist system the economic conservatives strive to strengthen and deregulate promotes and commercially markets the perceived assault on traditional values.

Frank applies his thesis to answer the question of why these social conservatives continue to vote for Republicans, even though they are voting against their best interests. He argues that politicians and pundits stir the "Cons" to action by evoking certain issues, such as abortion, immigration, and taxation. By portraying themselves as champions of the conservatives on these issues, the politicians can get "Cons" to vote them into office. However, once in office, these politicians turn their attention to more mundane economic issues, such as business tax reduction or deregulation. Frank's thesis goes thus:

Title 

The book derives its name from an August 15, 1896 editorial by William Allen White in the Emporia Gazette, in which he took Populist leaders to task for letting Kansas slip into economic stagnation and not keeping up economically with neighboring states because of Populist policies chasing away economic capital from the state. The Republicans sent out hundreds of thousands of copies of the editorial in support of William McKinley during the 1896 U.S. presidential election.

The editorial established White's career in journalism. Five Republican presidents — Theodore Roosevelt, William Howard Taft, Warren Harding, Calvin Coolidge, and Herbert Hoover — were to spend nights at his home.

Scholarly studies
The notion that American politics has been transformed because of defection from the Democratic ranks of working-class social conservatives is not a new idea. Bartels identifies numerous scholars making the claim. They argue that the class basis of New Deal coalition had given way to a new structure in which conservative ideology and cultural issues brought large numbers of working-class whites into the Republican camp.
As far back as Richard Nixon's first year in the White House, Kevin Phillips made the claim in The Emerging Republican Majority (1969).
 Political scientist Everett Carll Ladd Jr. in 1976 identified "an inversion of the old class relationship in voting" due to "the transformations of conflict characteristic of post-industrialism."
 Robert Huckfeldt and Carol Weitzel Kohfeld in Race and the Decline of Class in American Politics (1989) argued that "race served to splinter the Democratic coalition" because the policy commitments of the Civil Rights era provoked "[r]acial hostility, particularly on the part of lower-status whites."

Criticism
In the study "The Truth about Conservative Christians," two sociologists, Andrew Greeley and Michael Hout, claim to show that class  does  matter, despite Frank's thesis. Poorer Protestants, they argue, are much less likely to vote Republican than affluent ones. And, they claim, conservative Protestants are actually more likely to support progressive taxation than "mainline" Protestants are.

Conservative columnist John Leo argues that despite Frank's belief that conservative politics is just a game of "bait-and-switch", rural conservative voters have made their voices heard on a vast array of social issues. He points out that "few of the issues that traditionalists care about ever seem to come up for democratic vote. Major change is imposed by courts or manipulated behind the scenes by bureaucrats loyal to the new moralists and the Democratic Party"

Larry Bartels, an American political scientist and the Co-Director of the Center for the Study of Democratic Institutions and Shayne Chair in Public Policy and Social Science at Vanderbilt University, in "What's the matter with What's the Matter with Kansas?," tests "Frank's thesis by examining class-related patterns of issue preferences, partisanship, and voting over the past half-century." Specifically, Bartels focuses on four questions:
Has the white working class abandoned the Democratic party?
Has the white working class become more conservative?
Do working class "moral values" trump economics?
Are religious voters distracted from economic issues?
Bartels's answer to each question is "no." Frank provided a lengthy rebuttal to Bartels' analysis. More recently, in an apparent attempt to rebut Frank's rebuttal via Barack Obama's now infamous "bitter" label regarding Middle America during the 2008 Democratic Presidential campaign, Bartels offered a somewhat revised analysis of Frank's original thesis in an op-ed piece in the April 17, 2008 edition of The New York Times.

See also
What's the Matter with Kansas? (film)
Federal taxation and spending by state
Right-wing populism
Just How Stupid Are We?

Further reading

Notes

External links

Audio
Thomas Frank: What's the Matter with Kansas? 15 April, 2005 (Alternative Radio)
Radio interview with Larry Bartels 9/29/05. (Doug Henwood's "Behind the News")

Web pages

Thomas Frank Publisher's webpage (Henry Holt and Co.)
What's the Matter with Kansas? Publisher's webpage (Henry Holt and Co.)
 What's The Matter With "What's The Matter With Kansas"; The Nation; October 11, 2005; Larry Bartels's Study<<dead link>> (pdf) shows that the white working class hasn't moved right and that "moral values" are not pushing them to vote Republican and Thomas Frank's own rebuttal to this paper.
Paraphrases (not excerpts) of early paragraphs from the book.

2004 non-fiction books
Books about politics of the United States
Books critical of conservatism in the United States
Politics of Kansas
Henry Holt and Company books
Works about White Americans
Books by Thomas Frank
Metropolitan Books books
Books about Kansas
Non-fiction books adapted into films